The 2001 CFL Draft took place on Thursday, April 26, 2001. 48 players were chosen for Canadian Football League teams from among the eligible CIAU football players from Canadian universities, as well as Canadian players playing in the NCAA and the NAIA. Of the 48 draft selections, 26 players were drafted from Canadian Interuniversity Athletics Union institutions.

Round one

Round two

Round three

Round four

Round five

Round six

References 

Canadian College Draft
Cfl Draft, 2001